The Yakovlev AIR-6 was a Soviet light utility aircraft of the 1930s. It was a single-engined high-wing monoplane designed by Alexander Sergeyevich Yakovlev, with 128 being built.

Design and development
In 1932, the Soviet aircraft designer Alexander Sergeyevich Yakovlev, working as an engineering supervisor at the Polikarpov OKB, designed the AIR-5, a five-seat high-wing monoplane with a steel-tube fuselage and a wooden wing, powered by an American Wright J-4 Whirlwind radial engine giving 149 kW (200 hp). Although the AIR-5 successfully passed State acceptance trials, no production followed, as there was no suitable Soviet replacement for the imported engine.

Yakovlev instead designed a scaled-down aircraft of similar layout to the AIR-5, but powered by a readily available 75 kW (100 hp) Shvetsov M-11 engine, to serve as a light utility aircraft. The new design, the AIR-6, was a high-wing monoplane using much of the structural design of the AIR-5, (and also featuring landing struts from the Polikarpov U-2 and tail surfaces from the Tupolev I-5 fighter), with a pilot and one or two passengers sitting in tandem in an enclosed cockpit.

Operational history
The prototype AIR-6 flew in 1932, passing state acceptance trials in October 1933. An accident with the Yakovlev AIR-7 sport aircraft, however, was blamed on a design error by Yakovlev, who was sacked from the Polikarpov design bureau. This caused production plans to be delayed until Yakovlev was allowed to set up his own design bureau, with production starting in 1934. A total of 128 AIR-6s were built, with several being fitted with floats, and 20 equipped as specialist ambulance aircraft.

Operators

Soviet Air Force

Specifications

See also

References

Notes

Citations

Bibliography

 Gordon, Yefim, Dmitry Komissarov and Sergey Komissarov. OKB Yakovlev: A History of the Design Bureau and its Aircraft. Hinkley, UK: Midland Publishing, 2005. .
 Gunston, Bill. The Osprey Encyclopedia of Russian Aircraft 1975–1995. London: Osprey, 1995. .

1930s Soviet civil utility aircraft
Yakovlev aircraft
High-wing aircraft
Aircraft first flown in 1932